Świerszczów may refer to:

Świerszczów, Hrubieszów County, Poland
Świerszczów, Łęczna County, Poland
Świerszczów-Kolonia, Poland

See also
Świerszczewo (disambiguation)
Świerczów (disambiguation)